Mount Lamborn is a mountain summit in the West Elk Mountains range of the Rocky Mountains of North America. The summit of Mount Lamborn is the highest point in Delta County. Together with nearby Landsend Peak to the southwest, it lies at the western edge of the West Elks, rising dramatically nearly 6,000 ft (1,800 m) above the valley of  the North Fork Gunnison River to the west.

Mountain
Mount Lamborn is an eroded igneous intrusion that geologists call a laccolith.

See also

List of mountain peaks of Colorado
List of Colorado county high points

References

External links

A site about climbing Mount Lamborn

West Elk Mountains
Mountains of Delta County, Colorado
Landforms of Delta County, Colorado
Gunnison National Forest
Lamborn
North American 3000 m summits